Bourbon Street was a jazz club located at 180 Queen Street West in Toronto, Ontario.  Operating between 1971 and 1986, it was one of Toronto's preeminent jazz clubs and featured many internationally renowned musicians.

History
Bourbon Street was opened in 1971 by Doug Cole, also the owner of George's Spaghetti House. The club featured a largely American musical lineup that was backed by a local house band. In the fall of 1975 both Jim Hall and Paul Desmond recorded live albums at the club for A&M Records. These albums both feature all-Canadian bands.

Cole sold the club in 1983; Bourbon Street continued to feature music until 1986.  The building has since been demolished.

Live albums
Jim Hall - Jim Hall Live! (1975)
Paul Desmond - The Paul Desmond Quartet Live (1975)
Ed Bickert - Ed Bickert at Toronto's Bourbon Street (1983)
Lenny Breau Dave Young - Live at Bourbon Street (1983)

Newly released
Paul Desmond - Like Someone in Love: Live in TorontoPaul Desmond - Audrey: Live in Toronto 1975References

"George's Jazz Room." In The Canadian Encyclopedia Online.''

Defunct jazz clubs
Jazz clubs in Toronto